The Misagh-1 (also Mithaq-1)  is an Iranian man-portable surface-to-air missile. It was developed by the Shahid Kazemi Industrial Complex in Tehran.

The MANPADS was supplemented by the newer Misagh-2 missile system.

History
The Misagh-1 was reported to be found in anti-government insurgent arms caches in Iraq. The US military has suggestions that the MANPADs found were smuggled with Iranian assistance.

Design
The Misagh-1 is a variant or reverse-engineered clone of the Chinese QW-1 Vanguard.

Identification 
Visually, the Misagh-1 is virtually indistinguishable from the QW-1 it is cloned from and Pakistan's Anza missiles. It can be distinguished from the QW-1M/Misagh-2 and the QW-18/Misagh-3 by the Misagh-1's straight battery unit.

Operators 

 : Used by the Iranian military.
 : Said to be supplied to the Syrian Army.

Non-State Actors
 Hezbollah
 Anti-government insurgents in Iraq

References

Guided missiles of Iran
Surface-to-air missiles of Iran